KEQQ-LP (88.3 FM) is a radio station licensed to serve the community of Grand Forks, North Dakota. The station is owned by the Grand Forks Bible Study Group. It airs an educational talk radio format.

The station was assigned the KEQQ-LP call letters by the Federal Communications Commission on February 10, 2014.

References

External links
 Official Website
 

EQQ-LP
Radio stations established in 2014
2014 establishments in North Dakota
Talk radio stations in the United States
Grand Forks County, North Dakota
EQQ-LP